Nisaf (also spelled Nasaf) is a village in northern Syria, administratively part of the Hama Governorate, located west of Hama. Nearby localities include Kafr Kamrah to the southeast, Baarin and Taunah to the east, al-Bayyadiyah to the northeast, al-Suwaydah to the north and Ayn Halaqim to the west. According to the Syria Central Bureau of Statistics, Nisaf had a population of 4,048 in the 2004 census. Its inhabitants are predominantly Alawites.  The local governing council for Nisaf was established in 1977 and it became a village council in 1999.

References

Bibliography

 

Populated places in Masyaf District
Alawite communities in Syria